Josef Freiherr von Smola (16 November 1805 in Vienna – 29 June 1856 in Lyon) was an Austrian officer.

Life 
His father was Josef von Smola (1764–1820), officer and holder of the Knight's Cross of the Order of Maria Theresia. He graduated from Theresianischen Ritterakademie in Vienna and in 1820 he joined the artillery, just as his father. He continued to study, namely at the Vienna Polytechnic Institute. In 1831, he rose to the rank of battery commander, in 1840 to the rank of captain and company commander, and in 1848 to the rank of major. In 1849 he rose to the rank of colonel, and he joined the general directorate of the artillery as district commander in Vienna. From 1851, he worked as the artillery director in Prague, 1852 in Vienna and subsequently in Galicia. After that, he was promoted to major general and obtained the 8th field artillery regiment. In 1855, he became president of the committee of Artillery. He died in Lyon on his study trip.

References 
 Constantin von Wurzbach: Smola, Joseph Freiherr von. un "Biographisches Lexikon des Kaiserthums Oesterreich", volume 35, published by L. C. Zamarski, Wien 1877, pp. 189–192.
 A. Schmidt-Brentano: Smola, Josef d. Ä. Frh. von. in "Österreichisches Biographisches Lexikon 1815–1950 (ÖBL)", volume 12, published by Österreichischen Akademie der Wissenschaften, Wien 2001−2005,  (direct link to pp. 373).

Austrian Empire military personnel
1805 births
1856 deaths